The Liberal Imperialists were a faction within the British Liberal Party around 1900 regarding the policy toward the British Empire.  They supported the Second Boer War which most Liberals opposed, and wanted the Empire ruled on a more benevolent basis. The most prominent members were R. B. Haldane, H. H. Asquith, Sir Edward Grey and Lord Rosebery.

Beliefs

The Liberal Imperialists believed that under the leadership of William Ewart Gladstone the Liberal Party had succumbed to "faddists", sectional interests, and the "Celtic fringe" which prevented it from being a truly national party. Furthermore, the Liberal Party should include people of all classes, along with promoting working-class MPs in the Liberal Party. They also argued that the Liberals had lost the centre vote because the party had distanced itself from "the new Imperial spirit". Instead, they argued for a "clean slate", that the Liberal Party must change if it is to succeed. The old, classical Liberalism must give way to the new ideas of "National Efficiency" and imperialism.

History

The grouping came to prominence shortly after the failed Jameson Raid in 1895 and prior to the outbreak of the Boer war four years later, as tensions between Britain’s South African colonies and its neighbours increased.  Its leaders were members of the parliamentary Liberal Party – then in opposition – who supported the imperialist aspects of Lord Salisbury's Conservative government’s foreign policy.  This stood in contrast to the radical wing of the parliamentary Liberal Party, whose prominent members included former leader William Harcourt, John Morley and David Lloyd George.  Party leader Sir Henry Campbell-Bannerman, himself sceptical of Government foreign policy and particularly critical of the Colonial Secretary, Joseph Chamberlain, tried to bridge the gap between the two Liberal Party factions.

In the 1900 General Election Liberal Imperialist affiliated candidates were  opposed by the Unionist Coalition. In particular, Joseph Chamberlain labelled the entire Liberal party as 'pro-Boer' and unpatriotic in the Second Boer War. 

In 1902 the group changed its name to the Liberal League with more or less the same people involved. After the Liberal victory in 1906 they played major roles in the new Liberal government: Asquith, Grey and Haldane went to the Exchequer, the Foreign Office and the War Office respectively.

Political epithet

In modern times, "liberal imperialism" has been increasingly used as a political epithet against liberals in the United States. This modern term is unrelated to the historic political faction. Proponents often use the term to criticize Democratic Party foreign policy, calling it a form of cultural imperialism. They claim that liberal imperialists seek to impose their cultural liberalism on foreign cultures with more socially conservative values. It has been compared to neoconservatism in that liberal imperialists are willing to use military force to achieve their goals.

Notes

Further reading
 Bernstein, George L. "Sir Henry Campbell-Bannerman and the Liberal Imperialists." Journal of British Studies 23.1 (1983): 105-124.
 Boyle, Thomas. "The Liberal Imperialists, 1892–1906." Historical Research 52.125 (1979): 48-82.
Viscount Grey of Fallodon, Twenty Five Years. 1892-1916 (1925).
R. B. Haldane, An Autobiography (1929).
Robert Rhodes James, Rosebery (1963).
H. C. G. Matthew, The Liberal Imperialists. The Ideas and Politics of a Post-Gladstonian Élite (Oxford: Oxford University Press, 1973).
J. A. Spender and Cyril Asquith, Life of Herbert Henry, Lord Oxford and Asquith (1932).
Peter Stansky, Ambitions and Strategies (Oxford: Oxford University Press, 1964).
Tyler,  J. E. "Campbell-Bannerman and the Liberal Imperialists, (1906–1908)." History 23.91 (1938): 254-262.  online</ref> 

1895 establishments in the United Kingdom
Organizations established in 1895
1902 disestablishments in the United Kingdom
Organizations disestablished in 1902
Liberal Party (UK)
Political party factions in the United Kingdom
History of liberalism
Imperialism
H. H. Asquith
Second Boer War